Laci Boldemann (24 April 1921 – 18 August 1969) was a Swedish composer of German and Finnish descent.

Life and career
Boldemann was born in Helsinki. He studied at the Royal Academy of Music in London from 1937 to 1939, both conducting (with Henry Wood) and piano, where he continued his studies in Stockholm at the outbreak of war in 1939 with Gunnar de Frumerie.

In 1941 his citizenship forced Boldemann to join the German army and fight in the Soviet Union, Poland and Italy; he was later imprisoned in the US and returned to Sweden via France and Germany. After returning to Sweden in 1947, he joined the Swedish Composers’ Society and served as Secretary and Treasurer (1963—1969). He was also on the board of the Swedish Performing Rights Society and the Joint Council of Artists and Writers. He died in Munich.

The stimulation of literature played an important part in Boldemann's work. Music drama, art songs and fun songs for children, as well as vocal works with an orchestral accompaniment, were genres in which he composed.

His instrumental work is characterised by both lyrical freshness and percussive propulsion, in a traditional rather than avant garde style.

Compositions

Orchestral music
Symphony (1959–61)
La Danza, Symphonic overture (1949)
Sinfonietta for strings (1954)

Concert works
Piano Concerto (1956)
Violin Concerto (1959)

Chamber music
String Quartet (1957)

Instrumental
Little suite on nursery rhymes for piano (1961)
Small ironic pieces for piano op. 19 (1942–45)

Vocal
Lieder der Vergänglichkeit, cantata for baritone and strings (1951)
Four epitaphs for soprano and strings (1952)
Notturno for soprano and orchestra (1958)

Songs
50 songs, including the nursery rhymes Mice in moonlight (1961)

Works for the stage
Opera Svart är vitt(Black is white-said the emperor), 1965

Recording
Laci Boldemann, Swedish Society Discofil, 1988. (Stockholm Philharmonic Orchestra, Dag Achatz(fp.), Solveig Faringer(sop.), Naohiro Totsuka(cond.) )

References

1921 births
1969 deaths
Swedish classical composers
Swedish male classical composers
20th-century classical composers
Swedish opera composers
Male opera composers
Alumni of the Royal Academy of Music
German prisoners of war in World War II held by the United States
Swedish people of German descent
Swedish people of Finnish descent
Musicians from Helsinki
20th-century Swedish people
20th-century Swedish male musicians
20th-century Swedish musicians
Finnish emigrants to Sweden
Finnish expatriates in the United Kingdom